There is an important community of Romani people in Colombia consisting 8000 Colombians of Romani descent and are scattered throughout the country. In 1999, the Colombian government recognized the Romani people as one of Colombia’s ethnic minorities, so they can access educational, health and legal convenience. Thus, the Romani language has remained to be recognized as a minority language.

History
Christopher Columbus took four Romani whose punishment was introduced by the Spanish rulers for the crime of being Romani and wishing to preserve their own traditions and the Romani chib language was commuted to firm effort in the galleys.

The period of legal immigration was about to come to an end. In 1582, Spanish authorities passed a command outlawing the arrival of the Gypsies to the American colonies.

For five hundred years, from the beginning of the 13th century until 1864, many Romani were enslaved and persecuted in Eastern Europe. The new law banned the importation of slavery to the region, and demanded that any slaves from other countries who arrived would immediately be permitted to their freedom. 

As a result of the law, many Romani escaped European slavery by heading to Colombia, and the migration waves from Europe to the Americas had later continued throughout the 20th century and up to the present day.

References

External links
Gyspy migration history to Colombia

Colombia
Ethnic groups in Colombia